Kasur Museum is a cultural heritage museum established 1999, located in Kasur District, Punjab, Pakistan.

Gallaries
It consists of five galleries i.e. Archaeology Gallery, Coin Gallery, Islamic Gallery, Tehreek-e-Pakistan Gallery and Kasur Craft Gallery.

References

1999 establishments in Pakistan
Museums established in 1999
Museums in Punjab, Pakistan